The residential building of number 37, Népszínház street, is located in the 8th district of Budapest, Hungary, on the odd side of the street between Nagyfuvaros and Kisfuvaros street.

Location 

Its neighboring buildings are number 35 Ruchlinder house, built between 1911-1912 based on Béla Málnai and Haász's plan, and number 39 Atlas City Hotel, owned by Mellow Mood Hotels. The building is 600 meters away from the "Blaha Lujza tér" metro line 2 station and tram lines 4 and 6, 150 meters away from the "II. János Pál pápa tér" station of metro line 4, and 100 meters away from the stops of tram lines 28, 28A, 37, 37A and 62 as well as from the stops of bus lines 99 and 217E.

History 

The building was built between 1909 and 1911, with signs of Art Nouveau and Art déco, on the behalf of Ármin Goldberger and his wife based on the plans of Béla Löffler and Sándor Löffler. The Löffler brothers, Sándor "Samu" Löffler (1877, Budapest – 1962, Melbourne) and Béla Löffler (1880, Budapest – the end of the 1930s, probably Jerusalem), were architects in the turn of the century, in the early modernist era.

In 1906, they opened an architectural office in Budapest and with many of their works contributed to Budapest's cultural history and its cityscape, e.g.: 37 Népszínház Street, Magda Udvar in Mátyás tér 4. Their most famous work is the plan of the orthodox Synagogue of Kazincy Street, finished in 1913, with which they gained acknowledgement and publicity. The Löffler brothers became sought-after and successful architects of Budapest.

The building was a so-called "Yellow-star house".  The yellow-star houses were buildings in Budapest, which were appointed as residence for Jews, under the regulation 1944-IX/147.501-514 issued on 16 June 1944. The origin of the name is that under the regulation the entrance of the buildings had to be marked with the Star of David. Also in accordance with this regulation the Jews were obligated to wear yellow-stars as well.

The picture "37 Népszínház Street – first façade plan 1909" shows the first draft made by the architects, which was rejected. It's not so "common", but on several occasions the investor did not like the first draft and requested a completely new façade from the architects.

Pictures from 1911

Pictures from 2017

References
Népszínház utca

Népszínház utca 37.

Magyar Építőművészet 1911.(IX. year) 9. edition



Józsefváros
Art Nouveau architecture in Budapest
Art Deco architecture
Art Nouveau apartment buildings